The 1892 Furman Baptists football team represented Furman University as an independent during the 1892 college football season. Led by second-year head coach H. P. Young, Furman compiled a record of 1–0.

Schedule

References

Furman
Furman Paladins football seasons
College football undefeated seasons
Furman Baptists football